The Edmonton Oil Kings were a Canadian junior ice hockey team, and founding member of the Western Hockey League. They played at Edmonton Gardens in Edmonton, Alberta, and later Northlands Coliseum. In 1976, they moved to Portland, Oregon to become the Portland Winter Hawks. A second incarnation of the team played only one season in 1977–78 before moving to Great Falls, Montana.

Foundation of the Oil Kings 
The Alberta Amateur Hockey Association (AAHA) sought to combine the best players from the Edmonton Junior Hockey League into a Western Canada Junior Hockey League (WCJHL) team. An Edmonton team was formed for the 1950–51 season, but was denied entry since the WCJHL had already made its schedule. In response, the AAHA threatened not to sanction the other four Alberta-based teams in the league, but recanted and sought exhibition games for the Edmonton team. When players from Edmonton were added to the rosters of WCJHL teams, AAHA vice-president Art Potter stated that the players had not been released and faced suspension for not honouring commitments. After the players returned, Potter announced the team would be known as the Edmonton Oil Kings and play an exhibition schedule versus WCJHL teams.

Franchise history 
The Edmonton Oil Kings won the Memorial Cup in 1963 and 1966 as members of the senior men's Central Alberta Hockey League. The team was required to defeat the Alberta Junior Hockey League champion to earn the right to play for the national junior championship. They were also cup finalists seven different years between 1954 and 1971.

In 1966, Bill Hunter, the team's General Manager, was concerned about the state of junior hockey in western Canada. Each of the west's four provinces all had their own junior league, and Hunter felt that this put them at a disadvantage when competing nationally against the powerful leagues in Ontario and Quebec. Hunter hoped to form a unified western league to compete.

Hunter's hopes became reality in the summer of 1966, when a revolt within the Saskatchewan Junior Hockey League caused several of its top clubs, the Estevan Bruins, Regina Pats, Saskatoon Blades, Moose Jaw Canucks and Weyburn Red Wings, to leave the league and join Hunter's Oil Kings in forming a new league. A seventh franchise was also added in Calgary, the Calgary Buffaloes.

The Oil Kings captured back to back President's Cup titles in 1971 and 1972, however it would prove to be the final titles in the celebrated franchise's history, as the Oil Kings found it difficult to compete with the lure of pro hockey provided by the WHA's Edmonton Oilers. The Oil Kings moved to Portland, Oregon in 1976, to become the Portland Winter Hawks.

There was a second Edmonton Oil Kings hockey team in the WHL that played only one season. The Flin Flon Bombers moved to Edmonton for the 1978–79 WHL season, but only survived one year and moved on to Great Falls. The team folded as the Great Falls Americans, then was revived as the Spokane Flyers for two seasons before folding for good.

A new WHL team began play in Edmonton in 2007–08, reviving the Oil Kings name.

League membership 
The Oil Kings played in the following leagues during its existence:
 1951–56: Western Canada Junior Hockey League
 1956–66: Central Alberta Hockey League
 1966–76: Western Canada Hockey League
 1978–79: Western Hockey League

Season-by-season record 
Note: GP = Games played, W = Wins, L = Losses, T = Ties Pts = Points, GF = Goals for, GA = Goals against

Western Canada Junior Hockey League (1951–56)

Central Alberta Hockey League (1956–66) 

During this period the Oil Kings were a junior team playing their regular season in the senior-aged Central Alberta Hockey League. During the 1963–64 season, the Oil Kings also played an interlocking schedule of 14 games total against the seven teams in the original Saskatchewan Junior Hockey League. The results for the 1964–65 and 1965–66 CAHL regular seasons are unavailable.

Western Canada Hockey League (1966–77)

Western Hockey League (1978–79)

NHL alumni

Hockey Hall of Fame
 Bryan Hextall (player, 1969 induction)
 Johnny Bucyk (player, 1981 induction)
 Norm Ullman (player, 1982 induction)
 Glen Sather (builder, 1997 induction)

NHL 1st round draft picks
1969 NHL Amateur Draft - Frank Spring #4 Overall (Boston Bruins)
1971 NHL Amateur Draft - Ron Jones #6 Overall (Boston Bruins)
1971 NHL Amateur Draft - Dan Spring #12 Overall (Chicago Black Hawks)
1972 NHL Amateur Draft - Phil Russell #13 Overall (Chicago Black Hawks)
1973 NHL Amateur Draft - Darcy Rota #13 Overall (Chicago Black Hawks)
1975 NHL Amateur Draft - Robin Sadler #9 Overall (Montreal Canadiens)

See also 
 List of ice hockey teams in Alberta

References

External links 
Oil Kings Heritage

Defunct ice hockey teams in Alberta
Oil Kings
Ice hockey clubs established in 1951
Defunct Western Hockey League teams
1951 establishments in Alberta
1979 disestablishments in Alberta
Ice hockey clubs disestablished in 1979